ETIM training camp is a name that Joint Task Force Guantanamo counter-terrorism analysts applied to a place where two dozen ethnic Uyghurs held in Guantanamo are suspected of having received training.
JTF-GTMO analysts assert that the camp was run by a group they called the East Turkestan Islamic Movement, although Uyghur activists were not familiar with the groups.

The Uyghurs dispute that the compound was military training camp.
They state that there was only one weapon at the camp, an AK-47.
Some of the captives acknowledge that another Uyghur gave them a few hours of training on the rifle.
Others said they had never had any training.

References

Afghan training camps
East Turkestan independence movement